Pyracantha rogersiana, the Asian firethorn, is a species of flowering plant in the family Rosaceae, native to western China. It is grown in gardens, yards, and parks, where it can be used as hedging, wall cover, or in a mixed shrub border. The cultivar 'Flava' has gained the Royal Horticultural Society's Award of Garden Merit.

The seeds are somewhat poisonous if ingested, and may result in vomiting.

References

External links
info from shootgardening.co.uk on Asian Firethorn
info from Plants for a Future

rogersiana